Forest Hill, Nova Scotia could be the following places in Nova Scotia, Canada:

Forest Hill, Guysborough, Nova Scotia, in Guysborough County
Forest Hill, Kings, Nova Scotia, in Kings County
Forest Hills, Nova Scotia, a subdivision in Cole Harbour and Westphal in the Halifax Regional Municipality